Black Gate is the name of a brand of audio grade electrolytic capacitor made in Japan by Rubycon Corporation.  They have acquired a reputation for very high quality for use in the signal path, and power supplies, of audio circuitry.

The quality of capacitors may vary considerably depending on their construction and the type of insulating materials used. They are also known to deteriorate (or "drift") over time, just like any electrolytic capacitor.

The Black Gate capacitors are considered by some (Audio Note among others) to be the best electrolytic capacitor ever made although they are now discontinued.  They do however, continue to be held in high regard by many high-end Hi-Fi manufacturers; 
Due to dwindling stock and demand, prices have skyrocketed lately.  Many of their capacitors on the market are now fakes or just not available.

Black Gate capacitors base their manufacture on something called 'The Transcendent Electron Transfer' theory. The manufacturer attributes the capacitor's sonic quality to the use of fine graphite particles used in the separator between its anode and cathode.  While the manufacturer may claim that graphite (graphite is a conductor not insulator) is used as the dielectric in its capacitors, the truth is the carbon impregnated paper inside the Black Gate capacitors was the cathode, the aluminum foil was the anode and the alumina (aluminum oxide) layer that formed on the surface of the aluminum anode was the dielectric (separator) between the two plates.  Since aluminum oxide has the characteristics well suited for its dielectric duty to insulate the cathode from the anode whilst permitting a relatively high flux environment as the oxide layer formed could be very thin allowing the plates to be very close to each other, thus increasing capacitance.

Settling-in Period 
Many audiophiles believe it can take many hours before the maximum sonic benefits are heard in audio circuits that use Black Gates. This long settling-in procedure is often a controversial issue when auditioning such equipment, as the frequency response is said to tend to shift around greatly during this period, making the equipment sound different from one audition to another. Once completely 'burnt-in' however, the benefits are said to be heard clearly.  This settling period or burn in period was most likely attributed to the aluminum layer completing its reaction to form a complete and stable oxide layer on its surface once current and voltage are applied to the capacitor in a circuit.

Production
The Black Gate production has stopped in 2006, said to be caused by problems between Jelmax Co., Ltd. and Rubycon Corp., after 18 years of availability. The capacitors were manufactured by Rubycon under license for Jelmax Co., Ltd. which should close its doors in August 2007, once all their stocks get sold out.

Once the capacitors will become unavailable, or the current stocks become too old to be used due to deterioration, alternatives will have to be found. The Black Gate was very affordable when comparing it to some other similar-performing capacitors, and was easily available.

See also
 High-end audio
 DIY audio

Capacitors